Gert Wörheide is a German marine biologist who works mainly on marine invertebrates.  He earned his doctorate in geobiology from Georg-August-Universität, following this with a post-doctorate at Queensland Museum (1998-2002), where he worked with John Hooper on sponges, a collaboration which continues.

Following his postdoctorate in Queensland, Wörheide returned to Germany to become a junior professor in molecular geobiology at Georg-August-Universität (2002-2008), and in October 2008 was appointed Chair of Geobiology & Paleontology at Ludwig-Maximilians-Universität  (University of Munich) (his current position), where he continues to work on evolution and genomics, and  all things pertaining to marine invertebrates. His most cited paper with 559 citations (at 2020-09-29) is "Resolving Difficult Phylogenetic Questions: Why More Sequences Are Not Enough".

See also 
Taxa named by Gert Wörheide

References

Living people
Australian marine biologists
German marine biologists
Year of birth missing (living people)